is a Japanese manga series written and illustrated by Haruhiko Mikimoto. The manga was serialised in Kadokawa Shoten's Newtype beginning in 1989, and was later collected into five tankōbon volumes which were published between July 1989 and March 1998. The series was licensed in North America by Viz Media, who serialized it in Animerica Extra. The manga is also licensed in France by Panini Comics' Planet Manga imprint.

Manga
Kadokawa Shoten released the manga's five tankōbon volumes between July 1989 and March 1998. Viz Media released the five volumes between July 6, 2001 and April 7, 2004. Individual chapters are called "part"s.

Reception
Animefringe's Patrick King commends Mikimoto's artwork, saying that he has "an undeniable knack for illustrating characters that clearly convey their emotions". In a later review, King commends the series for its "sheer imagination and artistic brilliance" and comments that the manga's romance has "less panty shots and more drama than usual, and with the addition of a talking doll there's really no way you can go wrong here".

References

External links

1989 manga
Kadokawa Shoten manga
Romantic comedy anime and manga
Shōnen manga
Viz Media manga